McCosh is a surname. Notable people with the surname include:

A. J. McCosh (1858–1908), American football player and surgeon
Andrew K. McCosh (1880–1967), Scottish industrialist
Anne Kutka McCosh (1902-1994), American artist
David McCosh (1903–1981), American artist
James McCosh (1811–1894), Scottish philosopher
John McCosh (1805–1885), Scottish army surgeon and photographer
 James Eichelburger McCosh (fl. 1870s), builder & operator of McCosh Grist Mill, Randolph County, Alabama
Shawn McCosh (born 1969), Canadian ice hockey player
Shayne McCosh (born 1974), Canadian ice hockey player